Alpine Energy Limited is an electricity distribution business based in Timaru, New Zealand. The company own and operates the electricity distribution network in South Canterbury.

The network covers the towns of Timaru, Temuka, Waimate, Pleasant Point, Fairlie, Lake Tekapo, Twizel, and Mount Cook Village.

Alpine Energy holds the naming rights to Fraser Park, the home ground of the South Canterbury rugby union team and an alternate home ground for the Crusaders Super Rugby team, which means it is known as Alpine Energy Stadium.

References

External links

Electric power distribution network operators in New Zealand